Sageretia horrida is a 3m tall erect shrub with short branchlets and red-brown spines.  It is found on forest margins on mountains and stony slopes between 1900 and 3600 m in W Sichuan, E Xizang, NW Yunnan, China.

References

RHAMNACEAE

horrida
Flora of China